USS Muscatine (ID-2226) was a Norwegian refrigerator ship (reefer ship) obtained by the U.S. Navy from the United States Shipping Board (USSB) during World War I. She served for the duration of the war, carrying "beef and butter" for military personnel in Europe.

She returned to commercial service after the war and later was renamed Floridian and Elizabeth. During World War II, she was struck by torpedoes from a German submarine and sank in the Yucatán Channel.

Built at Shooters Island
Muscatine, a refrigerator ship built in 1917 as Stian by Standard Shipbuilding Corps., Shooters Island, New York, for the Norwegian firm Salveson, Chr. & Co., was commandeered by the United States Shipping Board and transferred to the U.S. Navy on 28 April 1918. She was commissioned on 2 May 1918.

World War I service
After refitting and loading a mixed cargo of U.S. Navy supplies, Muscatine cleared Halifax, Nova Scotia, Canada, in convoy on 30 May 1918 bound for France. Arriving at St. Nazaire on 14 June 1918, she discharged her cargo, proceeded to Verdun-sur-Mer, and departed in convoy for New York on 7 July 1918. In the subsequent months the ship made five more round trip voyages to St. Nazaire with cargoes of beef and butter.

After completing her last run early in July 1919, Muscatine was decommissioned at New York City on 16 July 1919 and returned to the  U.S. Shipping Board.

Subsequent career and fate
In 1929, Muscatine was sold to F. D. M. Stracham of Savannah, Georgia, and in 1930 she was renamed Floridian. In 1936, she was renamed Elizabeth.

During World War II, Elizabeth was torpedoed and sunk on 21 May 1942 in the Yucatán Channel by the German submarine  under the command of Werner Winter. Six of her 42 crew were lost.

References

 

Ships built in Staten Island
World War I auxiliary ships of the United States
Ships sunk by German submarines in World War II
World War II shipwrecks in the Caribbean Sea
Cargo ships of the United States Navy
Maritime incidents in May 1942